The 2014 Colonial Athletic Association women's basketball tournament was held March 13–16 at the Show Place Arena in Upper Marlboro, Maryland. Champion James Madison University received an automatic bid to the 2014 NCAA tournament.

The 2014 tournament featured nine teams due to the departure of George Mason from the conference to join the Atlantic 10, and the addition of the College of Charleston.

Schedule

Bracket

See also
 2014 CAA men's basketball tournament

References

2013–14 in American women's college basketball
Colonial Athletic Association women's basketball tournament
CAA women's basketball tournament 
CAA women's basketball tournament
Basketball competitions in Maryland
Women's sports in Maryland
College sports tournaments in Maryland